Ochthebius marinus, the marine moss beetle, is a species of minute moss beetle in the family Hydraenidae. It is found in Europe and Northern Asia (excluding China), North America, and Southern Asia.

References

Further reading

 
 

Staphylinoidea
Articles created by Qbugbot
Beetles described in 1798